Kung Fu Master (stylised as Kung-fu Master!, also known as Le petit amour in France) is a 1988 French drama film directed by Agnès Varda. It was selected to compete for the Golden Bear at the 38th Berlin International Film Festival.

Plot
Mary-Jane (Jane Birkin) comes across Julien (Mathieu Demy) during a party her teenage daughter Lucy throws at their home. Julien has drunk too much and Mary-Jane induces vomiting to help him feel better. Intrigued by him she goes to visit Lucy at school to see if she can see him again and almost hits him with her car. On the pretext of seeing if he's alright Mary-Jane takes Julien to a café where he plays his favourite arcade game, Kung Fu Master. Intrigued by Julien and knowing she wants to see him again Mary-Jane goes looking for other places with the game. Before she can think of another reason to see Julien however he comes to her home and they spend the day together shopping. At the end of the day Julien kisses Mary-Jane's hand.

At school Julien and Lucy must work together on a project and because he is so eager to work on the project she thinks that he has a crush on her.

Mary-Jane and Julien continue to think of ways to be near one another. When Mary-Jane overhears Lucy talking about Julien missing school she visits his home to give him his homework and allows him to fondle her breast. Later he invites her out to celebrate with him and takes her to a hotel where he kisses her. Mary-Jane tepidly resists but later slaps him after he begins smoking in the elevator and runs away from him.

While working on a project with Lucy, Julien learns that Lucy is going to England with her family over the upcoming holidays. Julien manages to get Lucy to invite him along. On Easter, while she is hiding eggs, Mary-Jane is surprised by Julien. The two end up kissing and are discovered by Lucy who is horrified by the fact that her mother is kissing a 14 year old boy. After telling her mother what has happened, Mary-Jane is encouraged by her to take Julien and her youngest daughter Lou to a remote island where the family owns a home to try and play out their flirtation. On the island the two of them declare their love for one another and enjoy a close relationship. At the end of their time on the island Mary-Jane worries that she'll lose Julien and he'll forget about her but he promises to love her forever.

After their return from the island Julien's mother threatens to press charges while Mary-Jane loses custody of Lucy. Mary Jane never hears from him again.

Meanwhile at an arcade Julien finally wins the Kung Fu Master game. He asks an arcade employee to call Mary-Jane and tell him that he has won but the employee gives up  after he calls and Lou answers the phone. Later at his new school when other boys ask if he's ever had a girlfriend he speaks disparagingly of Mary-Jane saying she was just a bored housewife he once slept with.

Cast
 Jane Birkin as Mary-Jane
 Mathieu Demy as Julien
 Charlotte Gainsbourg as Lucy
 Lou Doillon as Lou
 Gary Chekchak as a young man
 Cyril Houplain as a young man
 Frank Laurent as a young man
 Aurélien Hermant as Un jeune
 Jérémie Luntz as a young man
 Thomas Bensaïd as a young man
 Pénélope Pourriat a young woman
 Ninon Vinsonneau a young woman
 Bégonia Leis as a young woman
 Eva Simonet as the friend
 Judy Campbell as the mother
 David Birkin as the father

Production
Birkin conceived of the film while Agnès Varda was filming her for the documentary Jane B. par Agnès V. Most of the cast were taken from Birkin and Varda's family, with Birkin's real life daughters and parents playing her daughters and parents in the film. Charlotte Gainsbourg later admitted to disliking both the filming of Jane B. par Agnès V. and Kung Fu Master as Varda and her film crew remained camped in her home for a year in order to complete the projects.

Reception and release
In 2015, both Kung Fu Master and Jane B. par Agnès V. were acquired for U.S. distribution by Cinelicious Pics.  The films enjoyed a brief theatrical re-release before being streamed on the movie streaming service Fandor. Varda expressed frustration at the film's limited release saying "I can get the Palme d’Or, but I can’t get exhibition, so it’s a contradiction."

References

External links

1988 films
1988 drama films
1980s French-language films
French romance films
Films directed by Agnès Varda
Films about video games
1980s French films